V40 may refer to:

 LG V40 ThinQ smartphone
 Volvo V40 (disambiguation), two separate automobiles produced by Volvo
 V40 Mini-Grenade, a 1960s fragmentation grenade was manufactured in the Netherlands
 MÁV Class V40 electric locomotive of the Hungarian State Railways constructed by Kandó Kálmán in the early 1930s for the regular operation with 50 Hz industrial frequency of the line 1: Budapest–Vienna railway
 Vanadium-40 (V-40 or 40V), an isotope of vanadium